Well known laureates of Gujarati literature are Hemchandracharya, Narsinh Mehta, Mirabai, Akho, Premanand Bhatt, Shamal Bhatt, Dayaram, Dalpatram, Narmad, Govardhanram Tripathi, Mahatma Gandhi, K. M. Munshi, Umashankar Joshi, Suresh Joshi, Pannalal Patel and Rajendra Keshavlal Shah.

List

A

B

C

D

E

F

G

H

I

J

K

L

M

N

P

R

S

T

U

V

Y

Z

Writers
Gujarati
Gujarati